On Time Out of Time is a studio album by William Basinski. It was released on Temporary Residence Limited on March 8, 2019. It peaked at number 2 on Billboards New Age Albums chart.

For the album, Basinski collaborated with LIGO (Laser Interferometer Gravitational-Wave Observatory) to record the sounds of two black holes merging 1.3 billion years ago.

Critical reception

At Metacritic, which assigns a weighted average score out of 100 to reviews from mainstream critics, the album received an average score of 81, based on 8 reviews, indicating "universal acclaim".

Jack Bray of The Line of Best Fit gave the album an 8 out of 10, writing, "Whether it is the temporary respite from a challenging sonic environment or the steady progression towards splendour, On Time Out of Time is a rewarding experience for those willing to tolerate challenging moments in a celestial sea of sound." Oliver Thompson of Exclaim! gave the album a 7 out of 10, commenting that "Basinski's latest effort is ambitious yet remains rooted in what he does best: instilling a multitude of visceral, yet ambiguous, feelings within his listener."

Track listing

Personnel
Credits adapted from the liner notes.

 William Basinski – music
 Preston Wendel – additional synthesizer, engineering
 Lawrence English – mastering
 Dmitry Gelfand – photography
 Evelina Domnitch – photography
 Richard Chartier – design

Charts

References

External links
 

2019 albums
William Basinski albums
Temporary Residence Limited albums